Thirukanangur is a village in Sankarapuram Taluk, Kallakurichi district in southern India state of Tamil Nadu.

References

Villages in Kallakurichi district